Albion round open events were held between 1964 and 1968, both men and women competed.

Men's Albion round open

Men's Albion round team open

Women's Albion round open 

Defunct events at the Summer Paralympics
Archery at the Summer Paralympics